Iurie Reniță (born 5 April 1958) is a Moldovan politician and diplomat serving as member of Parliament of Moldova since 2019. He was the Moldovan Ambassador to Romania from 2010 to 2015 and Ambassador to Belgium and Luxembourg from 2016 to 2017.

Biography 

Iurie Reniță was born to Lidia and Dumitru Reniță on 5 April 1958 in Abaclia. He was part of the first graduating class of the Moldovan students at the Bucharest-based National School of Administration and Political Sciences. During 1996-1999 he was counselor at the Moldovan Embassy, Washington, D.C., after which he served as advisor to Foreign Minister Nicolae Tăbăcaru. Iurie Reniță also worked for several years with the Organization for Security and Co-operation in Europe Mission to Croatia and was manager of the British American Tobacco, Moldova. 

On June 21, 2010, Mihai Ghimpu signed a decree appointing Iurie Reniță the new ambassador of Moldova in Romania. He was elected member of Parliament of Moldova in the 2019 parliamentary election running as independent within the ACUM Electoral Bloc.

See also
 Moldovan Embassy, Bucharest
 Embassy of Romania in Chişinău
 Moldovan–Romanian relations

References

External links 
 Iurie Reniță
 Iurie Reniță: Vrem să lansăm construcția unor poduri la granița cu România 
 Moldovan ambassador to Bucharest: I am Romanian and I speak Romanian 

Living people
1958 births
People from Basarabeasca District
Romanian people of Moldovan descent
Moldovan MPs 2019–2023
Ambassadors of Moldova to Romania
Moldovan journalists
Male journalists
Moldova State University alumni
National University of Political Studies and Public Administration alumni